Qiasiyeh (also Romanized as Qīāsīyeh and Qeyāsīyeh; also known as Kayasa, Qīāseh, and Qiyasa) is a village in Sonbolabad Rural District, Soltaniyeh District, Abhar County, Zanjan Province, Iran. At the 2006 census, its population was 273, in 69 families.

References 

Populated places in Abhar County